Aechmea wittmackiana is a plant species in the genus Aechmea. This species is endemic to the State of São Paulo in Brazil.

Cultivars
 Aechmea 'Warren Loose'

References

wittmackiana
Endemic flora of Brazil
Plants described in 1888